"Travel to Romantis" is the third single from Flowers, an album by Swedish pop band Ace of Base.  The song was released on 16 November 1998 in Germany and Scandinavia and followed the singles "Life Is a Flower" and "Cruel Summer".

Critical reception
Quentin Harrison of Albumism said in his retrospective review of Flowers, that the band "construct whole worlds of ennui and escapism for listeners to experience" via songs like "Travel to Romantis". Swedish newspaper Expressen commented that it "is Neil Sedakas One Way Ticket (to the Blues) such as one early Modern Talking would have made it." Gary Shipes from The Stuart News described it as "a frothy gallop which reintroduces early '90s Eurodance to late '90s ennui."

Music video
A music video was produced to promote the single. The video was directed by Andy Neumann. Linn Berggren appeared in the video, however only for a few seconds.

Tracks
Scandinavia

CD single
 Travel to Romantis
 Whenever You're Near Me (Previously Unreleased) 3:32

Maxi CD
 Travel to Romantis (Album Version)  4:11
 Travel to Romantis (Josef Larossi Mix)  5:33
 Travel to Romantis (Love to Infinity Mix)  7:22
 Whenever You're Near Me (Previously Unreleased)  3:32

Germany

CD single
 Travel to Romantis  
 Whenever You're Near Me (Previously Unreleased)  3:32

Maxi CD
 Travel to Romantis  4:11
 Cruel Summer (Cutfather & Joe Mix)  3:33
 The Sign  3:10
 Beautiful Life  3:40
 Whenever You're Near Me (Previously Unreleased)  3:32

Official versions/remixes
Album Version
Radio Edit
Eurotracks Extended Mix
Larossi Extended Mix
Larossi Short Mix
Love To Infinity Master Mix
Love To Infinity Radio Edit
Wolf Mix

Charts

References

External links

Ace of Base songs
1998 singles
Songs written by Jonas Berggren
1998 songs
Mega Records singles
Polydor Records singles